Seongjong of Joseon (19 August 1457 – 20 January 1495), personal name Yi Hyeol, was the ninth ruler of the Joseon dynasty of Korea. Before succeeding his uncle, King Yejong, he was known as Grand Prince Jalsan (Korean: 잘산대군; Hanja: 乽山大君).

Biography

Early life 
Yi Hyeol was born as the second son of Crown Prince Yi Jang and Crown Princess Su of the Cheongju Han clan. His father however died few months after his birth. In 1461, he was named Prince Jasan (자산군) which was changed to Prince Jalsan (잘산군) in 1468.

In 1467, he married Han Song-yi, the youngest daughter of Han Myeong-hoe. One of Lady Han's older sisters was the late Crown Princess Jangsun, first wife of King Yejong.

Despite having an older brother and his uncle leaving behind a biological son, Jalsan was chosen as successor and was made the adopted son of King Yejong and his second wife, Queen Han (posthumously known as Queen Ansun).

After he ascended to the throne, his biological father was honored with the temple name "Deokjong" (덕종, 德宗), while his mother became queen and was given the honorary name "Insu" (인수, 仁粹).

Reign 
Since Seongjong was only 12 when he was crowned, his grandmother Grand Royal Queen Dowager Jaseong, ruled the nation along with his biological mother Queen Insu, and his aunt (and adoptive mother) Queen Dowager Inhye. In 1476, at the age of 19, he began to govern the country in his own name.

After the death of his first wife in 1474, Seongjong decided to promote one of his concubines, Lady Yun, to the status of primary wife and queen.

His reign was marked by the prosperity and growth of the economy, based on the laws laid down by Taejong, Sejong, and Sejo. He himself was a gifted ruler. In 1474, the Grand Code for State Administration, started by his grandfather, was completed and put into effect. Seongjong also ordered revisions and improvements to the code.

He greatly expanded the Office of Special Advisors (Hongmungwan; 홍문관, 弘文館), an advisory council to the king, which also served as royal library and research institute; he strengthened the Three Offices (Samsa; 삼사, 三司) – Office of the Inspector General (Saheonbu), Office of Censors (Saganwon) and Office of Special Advisors (Hongmungwan)– as a check and balance on the royal court. For the first time since Sejong the Great, Confucian scholars whose political views clashed with those of the conservative officials (members of the nobility who had helped Taejong and Sejo in their rise to power), were brought to court. By appointing able administrators regardless of their political views, Seongjong made his rule more effective and his policies resulted in many positive innovations, increasing his number of supporters.

The king himself was an artist and intellectual, and liked to argue about the finer points of politics with the more liberal scholars. He encouraged the publication of numerous books about geography and social etiquette, as well as areas of knowledge that benefited the common people.

It was under Seongjong's reign that the "Widow Remarriage Ban" (1477) was enacted, which strengthened pre-existing social stigma against women who remarried by barring their sons from public office. In 1489, Yi Gu-ji, a woman from the royal clan, committed suicide at his order and was erased from family records, when it was discovered that she had cohabited with her slave after being widowed.

In 1491, Seongjong started a military campaign against the Jurchens on the northern border, like many of his predecessors. Led by General Heo Jong (허종, 許琮), the campaign was successful, and the defeated Jurchens commanded by Udige (兀狄哈) retreated to the north of Amrok River.

Death 
He died in January 1495 and is buried in the south of Seoul. The tomb is known as Seonneung (선릉) and 35 years later, his third wife, Queen Jeonghyeon, was also interred here. Seongjong was succeeded by his son, Crown Prince Yi Yung.

Family 
 Biological father: King Deokjong of Joseon (조선 덕종) (1438 – 2 September 1457)
 Grandfather: King Sejo of Joseon (조선 세조) (2 November 1417 – 23 September 1468)
 Grandmother: Queen Jeonghui of the Papyeong Yun clan (정희왕후 윤씨) (8 December 1418 – 6 May 1483)
 Adoptive father: King Yejong of Joseon (조선 예종) (12 February 1450 – 31 December 1469)
Biological mother: Queen Sohye of the Cheongju Han clan (소혜왕후 한씨) (7 October 1437 – 11 May 1504)
Grandfather: Han Hwak (한확) (1400 – 11 September 1456)
Grandmother: Lady Hong of the Namyang Hong clan (남양 홍씨) (1403 – 1450)
Adoptive mother: Queen Ansun of the Cheongju Han clan (안순왕후 한씨) (18 April 1445 – 3 February 1499)
Consorts and their respective issue(s):
 Queen Gonghye of the Cheongju Han clan (공혜왕후 한씨) (8 November 1456 – 30 April 1474) — No issue.
 Deposed Queen Yun of the Haman Yun clan (폐비 윤씨) (15 July 1455 – 29 August 1482)
 Yi Hyo-shin (이효신) (1474 – 1475), first son
 Crown Prince Yi Yung (왕세자 이융) (23 November 1476 – 20 November 1506), second son
 Third son (? – 1479)
Queen Jeonghyeon of the Papyeong Yun clan (정현왕후 윤씨) (21 July 1462 – 13 September 1530)
 Princess Sunsuk (순숙공주) (1478 – 14 July 1488), first daughter
 Eighth daughter (1485 – 1486)
 Yi Yeok, Grand Prince Jinseong (진성대군 이역) (16 April 1488 – 29 November 1544), twelfth son
 Fourteenth daughter (1490 – 1490)
 Royal Noble Consort Myeong of the Andong Gim clan (명빈 김씨)
 Princess Hwisuk (휘숙옹주), fourth daughter
 Princess Gyeongsuk (경숙옹주) (1483 – ?), seventh daughter
 Eleventh son
 Yi Jong, Prince Musan (무산군 이종) (1490 – 1525), seventeenth son
 Princess Hwijeong (휘정옹주), twelfth daughter
 Twentieth son
 Royal Consort Gwi-in of the Chogye Jeong clan (귀인 정씨) (? – 1504)
 Yi Hang, Prince Anyang (안양군 이항) (1480 – 1505), fifth son
 Princess Sukshin (숙신옹주) (? – 1487/1489), third daughter
 Yi Bong, Prince Bongan (봉안군 이봉) (1482 – 1505), eighth son
 Princess Jeonghye (정혜옹주) (1490 – 6 August 1507), thirteenth daughter
 Royal Consort Gwi-in of the Yeongwol Eom clan (귀인 엄씨) (? – 1504)
 Princess Gongsin (공신옹주) (1481 – 1549), fifth daughter
 Royal Consort Gwi-in of the Andong Gwon clan (귀인 권씨) (1471 – 1500)
 Yi Byeon, Prince Jeonseong (전성군 이변) (1490 – 1505), sixteenth son
 Royal Consort Gwi-in of the Uiryeong Nam clan (귀인 남씨)
 Royal Consort So-ui of the Yi clan (소의 이씨)
 Royal Consort Sug-ui of the Jinju Ha clan (숙의 하씨)
 Yi Sun, the Prince Gyeseong (계성군 이순) (1478 – 1504), fourth son
 Royal Consort Sug-ui of the Namyang Hong clan (숙의 홍씨) (1457 – 1510)
 Princess Hyesuk (혜숙옹주) (1478 – ?), second daughter
 Yi Su, Prince Wanwon (완원군 이수) (1480 – 1509), sixth son
 Yi Yeom, Prince Hoesan (회산군 이염) (1481 – 1512), seventh son
 Yi Don, Prince Gyeonseong (견성군 이돈) (1482 – 1507), ninth son
 Princess Jeongsun (정순옹주) (1486 – ?), ninth daughter
 Yi Hoe, Prince Ikyang (익양군 이회) (1 July 1488 – 21 January 1552), thirteenth son
 Yi Chim, Prince Gyeongmyeong (경명군 이침) (1489 – 1526), fifteenth son
 Yi In, Prince Uncheon (운천군 이인) (1490 – 1524), nineteenth son
 Yi Hui, Prince Yangwon (양원군 이희) (1492 – 1551), twenty-first son
 Princess Jeongsuk (정숙옹주) (1493 – 8 February 1573), fifteenth daughter
 Royal Consort Sug-ui of the Jeong clan (숙의 정씨)
 Royal Consort Sug-ui of the Gim clan (숙의 김씨)
 Royal Consort Sug-yong of the Cheongsong Shim clan (숙용 심씨) (1465 – 1515)
 Princess Gyeongsun (경순옹주) (1482 – ?), sixth daughter
 Princess Sukhye (숙혜옹주) (1486 – 1525), tenth daughter
 Yi Gwan, Prince Iseong (이성군 이관) (1489 – 1552), fourteenth son
 Yi Jeon, Prince Yeongsan (영산군 이전) (1490 – 11 June 1538), eighteenth son
 Royal Consort Sug-yong of the Gwon clan (숙용 권씨)
 Yi Gyeong-seok (이견석) (1486 – ?), tenth son
 Princess Gyeonghwi (경휘옹주) (1489 – 1525), eleventh daughter
 Royal Consort Sug-won of the Yun clan (숙원 윤씨) (? – 1533)

Ancestry

In popular culture 
 Portrayed by Yun Sun-hong in the 1985 film Eoudong.
 Portrayed by Yoon Yang-ha in the 1988 film Diary of King Yeonsan.
Portrayed by Hyun Suk in the 1995 KBS TV series Jang Nok Soo. 
Portrayed by Lee Jin-woo in the 1998–2000 KBS TV series King and Queen.
 Portrayed by Yoo Seung-ho and Go Joo-won in the 2007–2008 SBS TV series The King and I. 
 Portrayed by Choi Won-hong and Baek Sung-hyun in the 2011–2012 JTBC TV series Insu, The Queen Mother.
 Portrayed by Choi Moo-sung in the 2017 MBC TV series The Rebel.
 Portrayed by Kim Jeong-hak in the 2017 KBS2 TV series Queen for Seven Days.

See also
Seonjeongneung

References

Notes 

 

1457 births
1495 deaths
15th-century Korean monarchs
People from Seoul